William H. Van Cleef (April 9, 1857 – November 20, 1934) was an American farmer and politician from New York.

Life 
Van Cleef was born on April 9, 1857 in an estate four miles north of Seneca Falls, New York, son of farmer William G. Van Cleef and Hannah N. Greene.

After finishing school, Van Cleef worked as an operator for a steam threshing machine for ten years. He then worked as a farmer, living on the estate he was born in. His farm had 130 acres and was largely devoted to raising Shorthorn Durham cattle. He was elected Highway Commissioner for the town of Tyre. He also served as town supervisor for Tyre. He was justice of the peace and a member of the town board for 12 years. His son Lawrence later occupied the latter two offices.

In 1923, Van Cleef was elected to the New York State Assembly as a Republican, representing Seneca County. He served in the Assembly in 1924, 1925, 1926, 1927, 1928, and 1929.

Van Cleef attended the Presbyterian Church. He was a member of the Grange. In 1891, he married Mary E. Beach of Montezuma. Their children were Ellen Hannah and Lawrence W.

Van Cleef died at home in Seneca Falls following a five year illness on November 20, 1934. He was buried in Restvale Cemetery.

References

External links 

 The Political Graveyard

1857 births
1934 deaths
People from Seneca Falls, New York
People from Tyre, New York
Farmers from New York (state)
Town supervisors in New York (state)
American justices of the peace
20th-century American politicians
Republican Party members of the New York State Assembly
Presbyterians from New York (state)
Burials in New York (state)